Victoria, officially the Municipality of Victoria, is a 2nd class municipality in the province of Tarlac, Philippines. According to the 2020 census, it has a population of 69,370 people.

The municipality is located in the province of Tarlac, geographically located in the central part of Luzon. It lies between 1"42’ north latitude and 120º35’ and 120"45 east longitude. It is bounded by Tarlac City, municipalities of Pura, Gerona, La Paz and to the east by the province of Nueva Ecija. The municipality has a total land area of 11,150 hectares, of which a large portion is used for agricultural activities.

History 
The establishment of Victoria as a community may be traced back in the mid 1800s when the Spanish regime started to expand north from Manila. It almost happened at the same time when Porac and Floridablanca (now part of Pampanga) and Tarlac (now Tarlac City) were formed. In the mid 1800s people started to settle around the swamp or wetland in search for a place where food is abundant. By 1849 houses and pockets of communities were deriving subsistence from the wetland. The biggest sitio was Namitinan which became part of the earliest barrio formed in 1852 called San Vicente de Canarum. The name was derived from the wetland called Canarum Lake. Not until the signing of the decree by the Spanish Governor General Manuel Crespo on March 28, 1855, that the barrio San Vicente de Canarum was separated from Tarlac to form an independent pueblo named Victoria. The name was used to highlight the victorious battle of the faithful followers of Queen Isabela II of Spain over their European enemies.

Traces of its Spanish history may still be seen in the well preserved municipal building, several old houses depicting Spanish architecture and various edifices that were built more than a hundred years ago.

Geography

Barangays
Victoria is politically subdivided into 26 barangays.

 Baculong
 Balayang 
 Balbaloto 
 Bangar 
 Bantog 
 Batang-batang 
 Bulo (Poblacion)
 Cabuluan 
 Calibungan 
 Canarem 
 Cruz 
 Lalapac 
 Maluid 
 Mangolago 
 Masalasa 
 Palac-palac 
 San Agustin 
 San Andres 
 San Fernando (Poblacion) 
 San Francisco 
 San Gavino (Poblacion) 
 San Jacinto 
 San Nicolas (Poblacion) 
 San Vicente (Poblacion)
 Santa Barbara (Poblacion) 
 Santa Lucia (Poblacion)

Climate

Demographics

Economy

References

External links 

 Victoria Profile at PhilAtlas.com
 
 [ Philippine Standard Geographic Code]
Philippine Census Information

Municipalities of Tarlac